The 2001–02 Bundesliga the 39th season of the Bundesliga. It began on 28 July 2001 and concluded on 4 May 2002.

Teams
Eighteen teams competed in the league – the top fifteen teams from the previous season and the three teams promoted from the 2. Bundesliga. The promoted teams were 1. FC Nürnberg, Borussia Mönchengladbach and FC St. Pauli. 1. FC Nürnberg and Borussia Mönchengladbach returned to the top flight after an absence of two years while FC St. Pauli returned to the top fight after an absence of four years. They replaced SpVgg Unterhaching, Eintracht Frankfurt and VfL Bochum, ending their top flight spells of two, three and one years respectively.

Team overview

(*) Promoted from 2. Bundesliga.

League table
The final table of the 1st Bundesliga, Season 2001/02

Results

Overall
Most wins - Borussia Dortmund and Bayer Leverkusen (21)
Fewest wins - FC St. Pauli (4)
Most draws - Borussia Mönchengladbach (12)
Fewest draws - 1. FC Nürnberg (4)
Most losses - 1. FC Nürnberg and FC St. Pauli (20)
Fewest losses - Bayer Leverkusen and Bayern Munich (6)
Most goals scored - Bayer Leverkusen (77)
Fewest goals scored - 1. FC Köln (26)
Most goals conceded - FC St. Pauli (70)
Fewest goals conceded - Bayern Munich (25)

Top goalscorers

Champion squad

References

External links

2001–02 Bundesliga on kicker.de

Bundesliga seasons
1
Germany